Airoldi is an Italian surname. Notable people with the surname include:

 Carlo Airoldi (1869–1929), Italian marathon runner
 Carlo Francesco Airoldi (1637–1683), Roman Catholic prelate
 Edoardo Airoldi (born 1974), Italian-American professor of statistics and data science
 Enrico Airoldi (born 1923), Italian bobsledder
 Joan Airoldi, American librarian
 Julien Airoldi (1900–1974), French politician
 Remo Airoldi (born 1921), Italian bobsledder
 Roberto Airoldi (born 1976), Italian paralympic archer

Italian-language surnames